Florence (2001 pop.: 1,684) is a community in the Cape Breton Regional Municipality, Nova Scotia, Canada. The community is located north of Highway 105 and west of Sydney Mines.

History
The community of Florence was named after Florence M. McDonald, wife of Daniel Duncan McKenzie, Member of Parliament for North Cape Breton and Victoria. He became interim Liberal leader upon the death of Sir Wilfrid Laurier in 1919, "ascending higher on the political pyramid than any other Cape Bretoner before or since."  Subsequently, he was Solicitor General in Mackenzie King's first cabinet and in 1923 was appointed to the bench of the Supreme Court of Nova Scotia.  In 1910 it was home to a large co-operative store located on Florence Corner. In 1950 Florence had its first little league team and was home to the Florence Coal Dusters in the 1970s. On June 11, 1951, a credit union opened on Pitt Street pioneered by George Walker, Jerry Rendell, and William O'Toole.

Mining
Florence Colliery was operated by the Nova Scotia Steel & Coal Company from 1902 to 1961. The Nova Scotia Steel & Coal Company opened No 4 Colliery in 1907 8000 feet west of Florence Colliery and operated it until 1921. The Franklin Mine was opened in 1946 where there was a coal washing plant. In 1911, Florence was home to a boarding house called Acadia House for local coal miners working at the colliery.

References

Communities in the Cape Breton Regional Municipality
Mining communities in Nova Scotia
General Service Areas in Nova Scotia